The Pashe or MIG-G-1900 is a class of fast patrol boat operated by the Navy of the Islamic Revolutionary Guard Corps.

It is a modified version of the American MK II boats, and is manufactured in Iran.

References 

Fast patrol boat classes of the Navy of the Islamic Revolutionary Guard Corps
Ships built by Marine Industries Organization